510 East St. Julian Street, also known as the Odingsells House, is a building in Savannah, Georgia, United States. It is located in the northwestern civic block of Washington Square and was built in 1797. Built as a home for Major Charles Odingsells, a native of South Carolina, it is now part of the Savannah Historic District and is the oldest building in Washington Square.

In a survey for Historic Savannah Foundation, Mary Lane Morrison found the building to be of significant status.

It is a one-storey gable-ended building finished in clapboard. It has a Federal-style center hall, which is flanked by a duo of sash windows. The house's stoop and steps lead up beyond a low basement. A porch was added in the 20th century.

This home, and the nearby Hampton Lillibridge House, were restored by Jim Williams.

See also 

 Buildings in Savannah Historic District

References 

Houses in Savannah, Georgia
Houses completed in 1797
Washington Square (Savannah) buildings
Savannah Historic District